Joshua Williams (born October 17, 1999) is an American football cornerback for the Kansas City Chiefs of the National Football League (NFL). He played college football at Fayetteville State.

Early life and high school
Williams grew up in Fayetteville, North Carolina and attended Jack Britt High School, where he played football and ran track. After graduating from Jack Britt, he completed a postgraduate year at Palmetto Prep in Columbia, South Carolina.

College career
Williams primarily played the nickel cornerback position as a freshman at Fayetteville State University. He moved to outside corner before his sophomore year and finished the season with 32 tackles, one tackle for loss, 11 passes defended, and two interceptions. Williams' junior season in 2020 was canceled due to Covid-19. As a senior, he had 31 tackles with nine passes defended and three interceptions, one of which he returned 32 yards for a touchdown, and was named first-team All-Central Intercollegiate Athletic Association. After the conclusion of his college career, Williams played in the 2022 Senior Bowl. Williams  participated in the 2022 NFL Combine.

Professional career

Williams was selected in the fourth round, 135th overall, of the 2022 NFL Draft by the Kansas City Chiefs.

Kansas City Chiefs (2022–present)
Williams caught his first career NFL interception in the Week 7 44-23 win over the San Francisco 49ers. In the AFC Championship Game, Williams had an interception on Joe Burrow which helped the Chiefs preserve the lead and win 23-20 when the game was tied at 20. The Chiefs reached Super Bowl LVII and defeated the Philadelphia Eagles 38-35. In the Super Bowl, Williams recorded 4 tackles.

References

External links
 Kansas City Chiefs bio
Fayetteville State Broncos bio

Living people
Players of American football from North Carolina
American football cornerbacks
Fayetteville State Broncos football players
Sportspeople from Fayetteville, North Carolina
Kansas City Chiefs players
1999 births